Airuno is a comune (municipality) in the Province of Lecco in the Italian region Lombardy, located about  northeast of Milan and about  south of Lecco.

Airuno borders the following municipalities: Brivio, Colle Brianza, Olgiate Molgora, Olginate, Valgreghentino. It is served by Airuno railway station.

Demographic evolution

History 

The presence of a settlement in Roman times is evidenced by the discovery of a lanceolate funerary stele, with Latin inscriptions, dating back to the late Roman period that came to light during excavations at the current Via Postale Vecchia. From Airuno, in Roman times, passed the Via Spluga, a Roman road that connected Milan with Lindau passing by the Spluga Pass.

It is mentioned in the will, dating back to 960, of a Lombard nobleman named Alcherio, resident in the Fortress of Airuno; watchtower at the time of the Romans, it was transformed by the Lombards into a fortified castle.

During the struggles that saw the Serenissima and the Duchy of Milan opposing each other for the control of the Colle di Brianza between 1447 and 1450, the fortress of Airuno was the operative base of Francesco Sforza, who at the end of the conflict obtained the lordship over the country and granted privileges and exemptions to the inhabitants. Where the fortress once stood, now stands the Sanctuary of the Madonna.

During the Spanish domination of the Duchy of Milan, in 1652 the governor Luigi de Benavides granted Airuno the ransom from the fiefdom.

References

Cities and towns in Lombardy
Articles which contain graphical timelines